St Patrick's College is a coeducational Catholic secondary (7–12) college, located in Launceston, Tasmania.  The college has close to 1500 students enrolled.

History
The present St Patrick's College began on February 7, 1873, when the Presentation Sisters began teaching pupils at their convent in Launceston and Sacred Heart College was established. The growing need for the education of Catholic children in Launceston was further met by the arrival of the Christian Brothers and the opening of St Patrick's Christian Brothers' College at York Street on February 3, 1919. The third branch of the threefold educational tradition in Launceston began with the establishment of St Thomas More's School under the auspices of the Sisters of St Joseph in March 1938 at Newstead.

The three schools flourished, and the Religious Orders made a significant contribution to the Catholic community of Launceston. Despite the hardships of earlier years, the Catholic community of Launceston continued to invest in the education of their children. Further financial strain and the challenges of a more extensive curriculum soon led to an amalgamation of the two secondary girl's Colleges of Sacred Heart and St Thomas More's. On March 3, 1978, the two schools joined to form Marian College.

In 1984, St Patrick's College became a co-educational secondary school when the secondary classes from Marian College were transferred to St Patrick's. In 1987, St Patrick's Preparatory School (boys, Grade 3-6) joined with Sacred Heart School (co-educational to Grade 2, then girls only). The newly combined Sacred Heart School continues as a co-educational primary school today. In 1998, Year 7 classes left St Thomas More's Newstead campus and joined the other classes at Prospect. The process of amalgamation to a Catholic College on a single campus was complete.

In 2019, St Patrick's College celebrated the 100th anniversary of the opening of the St Patrick's Christian Brothers' College. On Saturday, August 17, a gala dinner featuring parish clergy, alumni, staff, students and the wider community formally celebrated the anniversary.

Crest
The College crest, designed by staff and students, combines elements of the crests of the three Catholic colleges that previously existed in Launceston. The three sides of the triangle represent the three founding orders that were involved in the College (the Presentation Sisters, the Christian Brothers and the Sisters of St Joseph). The three red flames in the centre of represent the influence of the Holy Spirit on the founding orders, and the circle running through the triangle in the crest represents the unity of the three colleges combined. The chain in the crest symbolises the College's motto, and the cross represents the Christian faith as fundamental to the College.

House System
St Patrick's College is divided into four major houses. These are: MacKillop (blue), Tenison (yellow), Rice (red) and Nagle (green). These Houses act in the same way as houses do in many other Australian schools and students represent these bodies in school athletics and swimming carnivals as well as various academic competitions. Furthermore, each major House is divided into two sub-Houses -

MacKillop - St Mary of the Cross MacKillop - Co-founder of the Sisters of St Joseph

MacKillop Barry - Archbishop William Barry - Archbishop of Hobart 1926-29

MacKillop More - St Thomas More

Nagle - Sister Nano Nagle - Founder of the Presentation Sisters

Nagle Rochester - St John Fisher - Archbishop of Rochester

Nagle Young - Archbishop Guilford Young - Archbishop of Hobart 1955-88

Rice - Brother Edmund Rice - Founder of the Christian Brothers

Rice Bourke - The Bourke family - Generous benefactors to the founding schools

Rice Chisholm - Caroline Chisholm - 19th-century humanitarian known for promoting the wellbeing of female immigrants in Australia.

Tenison - Father Julian Tenison Woods - Co-founder of the Sisters of St Joseph

Tenison Cotham - Father James Cotham - First priest in Launceston 1 13c 897

Tenison Delany - Archbishop Patrick Delany - Archbishop of Hobart 1907-26
This House system is intwined with the college's pastoral care system through the Tutor groups, Tutor roles and House Head support roles

Facilities
St Patrick's College is situated on approximately 16 hectares (39 acres) in Prospect, a suburb of Launceston, Tasmania. With approximately 1500 day students it is the largest school accommodating Years 7 through to 12 in Tasmania.

Sport
St Patrick's College is a member of the Sports Association of Tasmanian Independent Schools (SATIS). The school competes in various competitions including: athletics, badminton, basketball, cricket, cross country, equestrian, football, hockey, mountain biking, netball, rowing, soccer, swimming and tennis.

SATIS premierships 
St Patrick's College has won the following SATIS premierships.

Combined:

 Athletics (11) - 1998, 1999, 2000, 2008, 2012, 2013, 2014, 2015, 2016, 2017, 2018
Rowing - 2021
 Swimming (15) - 1997, 1998, 1999, 2000, 2001, 2002, 2006, 2007, 2010, 2014, 2015, 2016, 2017, 2018, 2019

Boys:

 Athletics (5) - 1977, 1978, 1979, 1980, 2012
 Basketball - 2011
 Cricket (14) - 1963, 1964, 1977, 1985, 1993, 1995, 1996, 1999, 2003, 2006, 2012, 2014, 2017, 2022
 Football (15) - 1964, 1979, 1980, 1984, 1999, 2003, 2007, 2008, 2011, 2012, 2013, 2014, 2015, 2016, 2017, 2022
 Hockey (2) - 1980, 1982
 Rowing (3) - 2004, 2005, 2008
 Soccer (8) - 1989, 1993, 1998, 1999, 2010, 2011, 2012, 2017
 Swimming (7) - 1982, 1983, 2007, 2016, 2017, 2019, 2021
 Tennis (10) - 1963, 1964, 1965, 1969, 1970, 1971, 1987, 2002, 2003, 2004

Girls:

 Athletics (7) - 1991, 2002, 2013, 2014, 2015, 2016, 2018
 Football - 2018
 Hockey - 2015
 Netball (7) - 2006, 2009, 2011, 2016, 2017, 2018, 2020
 Soccer (9) - 2000, 2003, 2004, 2005, 2007, 2012, 2013, 2014, 2015
 Softball (5) - 2000, 2001, 2005, 2006, 2007
 Swimming (13) - 1984, 2007, 2009, 2010, 2011, 2012, 2013, 2014, 2015, 2016, 2017, 2018, 2019
 Tennis (7) - 1984, 2003, 2004, 2005, 2006, 2007, 2008

NSATIS premierships 
St Patrick's College has won the following NSATIS premierships.

Combined:

 Athletics (13) - 1993, 1998, 1999, 2011, 2012, 2013, 2014, 2015, 2016, 2017, 2018, 2019, 2021
 Cross Country (12) - 2010, 2011, 2012, 2013, 2014, 2015, 2016, 2017, 2018, 2019, 2021, 2022
 Swimming (20) - 1996, 1997, 1999, 2000, 2001, 2002, 2003, 2004, 2005, 2006, 2007, 2008, 2010, 2011, 2015, 2016, 2017, 2018, 2019, 2020

Boys:

 Athletics (13) - 1993, 1998, 1999, 2011, 2012, 2013, 2014, 2015, 2016, 2017, 2018, 2019, 2021
 Cross Country (14) - 1993, 1994, 2010, 2011, 2012, 2013, 2014, 2015, 2016, 2017, 2018, 2019, 2021, 2022
 Soccer (1sts) (19) - 1993, 1994, 1995, 1996, 1997, 1998, 1999, 2002, 2009, 2010, 2011, 2012, 2013, 2014, 2016, 2017, 2018, 2020, 2021
 Swimming (16) - 1999, 2000, 2001, 2002, 2003, 2004, 2005, 2006, 2007, 2009, 2015, 2016, 2017, 2018, 2019, 2021
 Tennis (1sts) (4) - 2002, 2003, 2004, 2021
 Tennis (2nds) (5) - 2000, 2002, 2003, 2004, 2011 

Girls:

 Athletics (10) - 1998, 1999, 2001, 2013, 2014, 2015, 2016, 2017, 2018, 2019
 Cross Country (10) - 1998, 2008, 2013, 2014, 2015, 2016, 2017, 2018, 2019, 2021
 Swimming (23) - 1995, 1996, 1997, 1998, 2000, 2001, 2002, 2003, 2005, 2006, 2007, 2008, 2010, 2011, 2012, 2013, 2014, 2015, 2016, 2017, 2018, 2019, 2020
 Tennis (1sts) (7) - 2002, 2003, 2004, 2005, 2006, 2007, 2008,
 Tennis (2nds) (2) - 2001, 2002

Notable former students

Business
 Eva Skira AM - Business

Entertainment/Journalism
 John Gregg - Actor
 Neil Kearney - Journalist
 Tim Lane - Sports Broadcaster/Journalist

Politics
 Kathryn Hay - Politician
 Sue Hickey - Politician
 Brendan Nelson AO - Politician
 Justin O'Byrne AO - Politician

Science
 Dr Chantel Thorton - Surgeon

Sports
 Tom Bellchambers - AFL Footballer, Essendon Football Club
 Tony Benneworth - Cricketer
 Tim Coyle - Cricket Coach
 Luigi Carmine (Gino) Fratangelo - Weightlifter
 Jake Kolodjashnij - AFL Footballer, Geelong Football Club
 Kade Kolodjashnij - AFL Footballer, Gold Coast Football Club, Melbourne Football Club
 Brendan Long - Rower
 Gail Luke (Millar) - Athlete
 Simon Miotto - Soccer Player
 Richie Porte - Cyclist
 Tarryn Thomas - AFL Footballer, North Melbourne Football Club
 Jackson Thurlow - AFL Footballer, Geelong Football Club, Sydney Swans
 Ariarne Titmus - Swimmer
 Rebecca Van Asch - Lawn Bowler
 Rhyan Mansell- AFL Footballer

See also

 List of schools in Tasmania
 Education in Tasmania
 Roman Catholic Archdiocese of Hobart
 Catholic education in Australia

References

External links
 St Patrick's College, Launceston website

Congregation of the Sisters of Saint Joseph
Rock Eisteddfod Challenge participants
Catholic secondary schools in Tasmania
Schools in Launceston, Tasmania
Educational institutions established in 1919
1919 establishments in Australia